Panzer Flower are a French electronic project from Occitanie, consisting of Patrice Duthoo and Raphaël Glatz. It was named "Meilleur Espoir Français" (Best French Hopefuls) by the French music magazine Rock & Folk. The duo's best known hit is the 2014 single "We Are Beautiful" produced by jean louis Palumbo and features vocals of Hubert Tubbs.

Discography

Singles

References

Electronic music duos
French electronic music groups
Musical groups established in 2011
Musical groups from Occitania (administrative region)
2011 establishments in France